The 1966 Irish presidential election was the fifth election in Ireland and was held on Wednesday, 1 June 1966. Incumbent president Éamon de Valera, 83 and with a rapidly deteriorating eyesight, standing for Fianna Fáil was narrowly re-elected, with Fine Gael candidate Tom O'Higgins coming within 1% (or 10,718 votes) of defeating de Valera.

Nomination process
Under Article 12 of the Constitution of Ireland, a candidate for president may be nominated by:
at least twenty of the 204 serving members of the Houses of the Oireachtas, or
at least four of 31 councils of the administrative counties, including county boroughs, or
themselves, in the case of a former or retiring president.

On 27 April, the Minister for Local Government made the order for the presidential election, with noon on 10 May as the date for nominations, and 1 June as the date of polling. 

Independent broadcaster and genealogist Eoin "the Pope" O'Mahony, who had sought and failed to be nominated in 1959, tried again, unsuccessfully. He wrote to local authorities and was allowed to address eleven. He fell short of the requisite four nominations: only North Tipperary County Council vote in his favour, and later reversed the decision; Wicklow County Council fell one vote short.

As president, Éamon de Valera had the right to nominate himself for a second term, but he chose to be nominated by Fianna Fáil, the party he had led from 1926 until his election in 1959. Then Fianna Fáil leader and Taoiseach Seán Lemass had urged de Valera not to retire, as he had been considering. De Valera's campaign manager was Charles Haughey, later to become Fianna Fáil leader and Taoiseach.

Fine Gael nominated Tom O'Higgins, who had served as a TD since 1948, and was 49 at the time of the election. Gerard Sweetman served as his election director.

De Valera did not campaign, and to maintain balance, RTÉ chose not to cover the campaign of O'Higgins either.

Result

References

1966 elections in the Republic of Ireland
1966 in Irish politics
Charles Haughey
Éamon de Valera
Presidential elections in Ireland
June 1966 events in Europe